Ulmus laevis var. celtidea Rogow. is a putative variety of European White Elm first described by Rogowicz, who found the tree in 1856 along the river Dnjepr near Chernihiv in what is now northern Ukraine. The type specimen is held at the National Herbarium of Ukraine.  The variety was first named as Ulmus pedunculata var. celtidea. Litvinov (1908) considered it a species, calling it Ulmus celtidea Litv., a view not upheld by other authorities.

Similar trees were later found near Briansk in Oryol Oblast, but featured larger leaves.

Description
The samarae were also notably smaller than the species

Cultivation
One specimen which grew at the Strona Arboretum, University of Life Sciences, Warsaw, Poland, (as Ulmus celtidea Litv.) died circa 2006. The tree was grown from seed collected from a tree at the Arboretum of the Forest-Technical Academy in St. Petersburg in 1961; it is not known whether this source is still alive. No cultivars or hybrid cultivars are known.

Accessions

North America
 Morton Arboretum, US. Acc. no. 1302-27  Grafts (6) from Arnold Arboretum of Harvard University (received as Ulmus laevis var. celtidea).

Europe
 Royal Botanic Gardens Wakehurst Place, UK. Acc. no. 1973-21047, as Ulmus laevis var. glabra obtained from a grafted tree grown at Kew now lost; provenance notes of the latter have not survived either.

Synonyms
 Ulmus celtidea: Litvinov, Schedae. Herb. Fl. Ross., vi. 167, 1908.
 Ulmus pedunculata var. celtidea. Rogow. 1856.
 Ulmus pedunculata (: laevis) var. glabra: Trautvetter,  Bulletin de la Classe physico-mathématique de l'Académie impériale des sciences de Saint-Pétersbourg, xv. 349 1857.
 Ulmus effusa Will. f. celtidea Rogow.

References

External links
 Ecology of the European White Elm
 Photo of type specimen of Ulmus celtidea (Rogov.) Litw. at National Herbarium of Ukraine

Elm species and varieties
Ulmus articles missing images
laevis var. celtidea